Lobelia deckenii is a species of flowering plant in the family Campanulaceae. It is a giant lobelia endemic to the mountains of Tanzania. It is listed as a threatened plant of the forests of Cherangani hills, Kenya.
It grows in moist areas, such as valley bottoms and moorland, in contrast to Lobelia telekii which grows in a similar but drier habitat. These two species produce occasional hybrids. Lobelia deckenii plants usually produce multiple rosettes. Each rosette grows for several decades, produces a single large inflorescence and hundreds of thousands of seeds, then dies. Because individual plants have multiple rosettes, they survive to reproduce repeatedly, and plants with more rosettes flower more frequently. It is iteroparous.

Lobelia deckenii plants usually form between one and eighteen rosettes which are connected underground. The individual rosettes grow slowly in the alpine environment,  and may take decades to reach reproductive size. The rosette that produces an inflorescence dies after flowering, but the remaining connected rosettes live on.

It is eaten less by rock hyrax than Lobelia telekii, which occurs more often in hyrax habitat. The lobelia species on Mount Kenya are both pollinated by birds, especially the scarlet-tufted sunbird and the alpine chat.

This species of giant lobelia is known for the reservoirs of water held in its rosettes, which freeze at night and protect the apical meristem which is contained in a dense central leaf bud. When this reservoir is drained, the temperature of the inner meristem drops below freezing, which does not occur when the fluid is left intact. The crescent-shaped ice cubes formed in these rosettes gave rise to the nickname, "gin and tonic lobelia".

Gallery

References

External links
 

deckenii
Flora of Tanzania
Afromontane flora
Taxa named by Paul Friedrich August Ascherson
Taxa named by William Hemsley (botanist)